Winchester College Chapel Choir is an historic British boys choir that sings in the Chapel of Winchester College.   It contains boys under age 12 as well as older students from Winchester College.  The Choir has performed on the radio and on international tours.

History 
When William of Wykeham founded Winchester College,  he provided for 16  boys under age 12 to sing in the Choirs. These young boys are called Quiristers, or Qs . The Quiristers are educated at The Pilgrims’ School, receiving a 40% discount on the school’s  boarding fee. The lower parts of Chapel Choir are sung by senior boys from the school, some of whom were previously Quiristers.

Winchester College has maintained this same choral foundation for more than 625 years.

Performances
The Choir has performed Benjamin Britten’s A Ceremony of Carols on BBC Radio 4, ‘Choral Evensong' on BBC Radio 3 and Classic FM’s annual Christmas concert.

The choir has toured Russia, Italy, Holland, France and the USA.  It has competed in the BBC Young Chorister of the Year competition, winning three times.l

Directors
The Director of Chapel Music at Winchester College is Howard Ionascu (as of December 2018), previously Director of the Junior Academy at the Royal Academy of Music.  Previous directors include David Hurley (2017–2018), Malcolm Archer (2007–2017), Christopher Tolley (1992–2007), Julian Smith (1977–1992) and Raymond Humphrey (1970–1977).

Cathedral musicians and composers have served as College Organists and Masters of Music over the centuries. These include Thomas Weelkes, Jeremiah Clarke, Samuel Sebastian Wesley and George Dyson.

References

Boys' and men's choirs
Winchester College
1382 establishments in England